Pendas (also Romanized as Pendās and Pandās; also known as Phandas) is a village in Golab Rural District, Barzok District, Kashan County, Isfahan Province, Iran. At the 2006 census, its population was 134, in 53 families.

References 

Populated places in Kashan County